The 2017 Monaco FIA Formula 2 round was a pair of motor races held on 26 and 27 May 2017 at the Circuit de Monaco in Monte-Carlo, Monaco as part of the FIA Formula 2 Championship. It was the third round of the 2017 FIA Formula 2 Championship and was run in support of the 2017 Monaco Grand Prix.

Report

Background

Practice and qualifying 
For qualifying, the field was split into two groups due to the short nature of the circuit.

Feature Race 
After an aborted start due to Antonio Fuoco and Sean Gelael stalling on the grid, Charles Leclerc led into the first corner, followed by Alexander Albon and Oliver Rowland. A concertina effect occurred at the Grand Hotel Hairpin as Canamasas was spun, causing Gelael to lose his front wing and bringing out a local yellow. Whilst Leclerc was setting fastest laps up the front, Nicholas Latifi went out with engine failure in the tunnel, bringing out the safety car. Leclerc maintained the lead on the restart and began to set the track alight, setting fastest lap after fastest lap, eventually building a big gap back between himself and Rowland. Contact between Robert Visoiu and Louis Deletraz caused another safety car. Leclerc took his compulsory pitstop immediately and came out in fourth place after initial confusion with the safety car saw him lose the gap and then some to Rowland. Worse would come for Leclerc after an insecure tyre would force him into the pits on the restart. However, it would not come right for Leclerc and subsequently, was forced to retire from the race. Rowland would maintain the lead until the end, winning the race and racking up valuable points while doing it. Artem Markelov and Nobuharu Matsushita rounded out the podium.

Sprint Race

Classifications

Qualifying

Group A

Group B

Feature Race

Sprint Race

Championship standings after the round

Drivers' Championship standings

Teams' Championship standings

 Note: Only the top five positions are included for both sets of standings.

References

External links 
 

Monaco
Formula 2
Formula 2